Highway 43 is a highway in the Canadian province of Saskatchewan. It runs from Highway 4 until Highway 2. It passes through the town Gravelbourg.

Major intersections
From west to east:

References

043